Michelle Marie Hickmott (born 20 February 1985) is an English football full-back. She most recently played club football for Coventry City Ladies and has represented England at senior international level.

Club career
Hickmott's first experience of team football came after a successful trial as a 13-year-old with Birmingham City Ladies. After just one season in the under-14s team, then manager Marcus Bignot promoted Hickmott to the senior side, with her debut coming against Garswood Saints in the Midland Combination.

Although initially a midfielder, Bignot switched Hickmott to left-back and she was a regular in the side that won first the Midland Combination and then the FAWPL Northern Division, and with it promotion to the FA Women's Premier League. She remained with Birmingham for their first season of Premier League football, including an appearance in the League Cup finalist side. In September 2002 she joined the FA National Player Development Centre at Loughborough University.

On leaving Birmingham at the end of the 2002–2003 season, Hickmott joined Fulham Ladies, playing in Europe for Marieanne Spacey's side. Fulham had reverted to semi-professional status at the time of Hickmott's arrival, causing the departure of high-profile players such as Rachel Yankey, Rachel Unitt and Katie Chapman.

Hickmott remained with Fulham initially, but a month into the following season, left to join Northern Division Coventry Ladies, where she was employed as a coach within their centre of excellence and also worked for the Birmingham FA. With Coventry relegated back to the Midland Combination, Hickmott joined Charlton Ladies where she played in the League Cup winning side against Arsenal and was an unused substitute for their FA Cup win.

In June 2007 she returned to Birmingham Ladies.

International career
Within a season of starting her career, Hickmott was selected for the England Under-14 side, quickly progressing to the Under-16 side. She went on to win 49 caps at youth level for England, captaining England in the Under-23's Nordic Cup. Hickmott's senior debut came when she replaced Corinne Yorston during a 4–1 win over Finland in Larnaca in February 2009. In June 2009, Hickmott was included in England coach Hope Powell's 30-player squad for the friendlies against Iceland and Denmark.

Personal life
In addition to playing football, Hickmott is employed as a fire fighter with the Warwickshire Fire Service. Prior to joining the fire service she had been a coach with the Birmingham Football Association.

References

1985 births
Living people
English women's footballers
Fulham L.F.C. players
Charlton Athletic W.F.C. players
Birmingham City W.F.C. players
Coventry United W.F.C. players
FA Women's National League players
England women's international footballers
England women's under-23 international footballers
Women's association football fullbacks
British firefighters